{{Infobox military conflict
| conflict          = Battle of Kirkuk (2014)
| partof            = the War in Iraq and the Northern Iraq offensive (June 2014)
| image             = Kirkuk in Iraq.svg
| image_size        = 300px
| caption           = 
| date              = 17–18 June 2014()
| place             = Kirkuk, Kirkuk Governorate, Iraq
| coordinates       = 
| map_type          = 
| map_relief        = 
| latitude          = 
| longitude         = 
| map_size          = 
| map_marksize      = 
| map_caption       = 
| map_label         = 
| territory         = 
| result            = Kurdish government victory
 ISIL offensive failed and withdrew out of the city.
 ISIL captured at least 4 villages.
| status            = 
| combatant1        =  Peshmerga
 CJTF–OIR| combatant2        =  Islamic State of Iraq and the Levant
| commander1        =  Masoud Barzani (President of Iraqi Kurdistan)
| commander2        =  Abu Bakr al-Baghdadi (Self-declared "Caliph" of ISIL)
| strength1         = 
| strength2         = 
| casualties1       = unknown
| casualties2       = unknown
| notes             = 
| campaignbox       = 
}}

The Battle of Kirkuk (2014)''' was an offensive launched by ISIL against the Peshmerga forces.

Background 
On 10 June 2014, the ISIL and JRTN forces capturing the second biggest city in Iraq, Mosul, after a 6-day battle in the city.

On 12 June 2014, The Kurdish Peshmerga forces controlled the city of Kirkuk. After that, the Iraqi Army fled before any offensive was launched by the Islamist Forces.

The Battle
On 17 June 2014, the ISIL forces started an offensive to conquer the city. Soon after, the group attacked the village Basheer 15 km south of Kirkuk city, the group clashed with the local forces, capturing the village after an hour of fighting.
The group also captured two sub-districts of the city: one in the west of Kirkuk city (Multaqa sub-district) and one in the south of Kirkuk city (Taza sub-district)
Later in the day the Peshmerga forces with support of air strikes by their allies, the (US-led Coalition), recaptured both sub-districts of the city.

On 18 June 2014, ISIL tried to capture the city once again, this time in the northern part of the city. They also tried to capture its oil reserves as well. However, the Peshmerga forces successfully defended the city against the isis again.

Aftermath 

In the end of July the Badr Organization and some locals recruited Shi’a Turkmen fighters to attack the village Bashir in an attempted counter-offensive.

On the night of 29 January and 30 January, ISIL attacked Kirkuk in a new battle.

References 

Kirkuk
War in Iraq (2013–2017)
Peshmerga
Kirkuk